Pupunki is a village in Jharkhand state, India, close to the Damodar River separating the Dhanbad and the Bokaro districts near the NH-32 highway.

The State Bank of India, Pupunki Ghat Bera branch (05781), and a Hyundai car workshop are located in the village.

It is also home to the Pupunki Ashram.

Villages in Bokaro district